The 8th National Television Awards ceremony was held at the Royal Albert Hall on 15 October 2002 and was hosted by Sir Trevor McDonald.

Awards

References

National Television Awards
National Television Awards
National Television Awards
2002 in London
National Television Awards
National Television Awards